Larry Romanchych (born September 7, 1949) is a Canadian former professional ice hockey player who played 298 games in the National Hockey League with the Chicago Black Hawks and Atlanta Flames from 1970 to 1977. He retired in 1978 from professional hockey.

In 1979, Romanchych founded Crescent Moving & Storage, Ltd. in White Rock, British Columbia.

Career statistics

Regular season and playoffs

External links
 

1949 births
Living people
Atlanta Flames players
Brandon Wheat Kings players
Canadian ice hockey right wingers
Chicago Blackhawks draft picks
Chicago Blackhawks players
Dallas Black Hawks players
Flin Flon Bombers players
Maine Mariners players
Ice hockey people from Vancouver
Tulsa Oilers (1964–1984) players